Sollie Herman "Jew" Cohen (September 6, 1907 – April 1, 1966) was a college football player and later a businessman of Lake Providence, Louisiana.

Early years
Cohen's parents were Jews from Russia. He was from Delta City, Mississippi and attended Rolling Fork High School.

Ole Miss
Cohen was a prominent fullback on the Ole Miss Rebels football team.  Cohen was named to the Mississippi All-Time Team by football historian Dr. L.H. Baker. He remained a prominent booster for the Ole Miss program long after his time at the school. He was "known as one of the greatest interference runners the South ever produced." He also excelled on defense.

1927
In 1927 he led Ole Miss to a 5–3–1 season and was selected All-Southern. Ole Miss won the first Egg Bowl with a trophy in 1927. Cohen scored the first touchdown for Ole Miss, capping a 51-yard scoring drive with a 1-yard plunge. He was chosen for the All-Southern team which played a game against Pacific Coast stars and won.

Lake Providence
In the 1940s he lived in Lake Providence, Louisiana where he owned a furniture and appliance store.

References

External links

Jewish American sportspeople
Ole Miss Rebels football players
American football fullbacks
People from Sharkey County, Mississippi
Players of American football from Mississippi
All-Southern college football players
People from Lake Providence, Louisiana
1966 deaths
1907 births
20th-century American Jews